Frigga Carlberg, née Anna Fredrika Lundgren (10 August 1851 – 3 October 1925), was a Swedish writer, social worker, feminist and advocate for women's suffrage.
She was a member of the central committee of the National Association for Women's Suffrage from 1903 to 1921 and chair of the Gothenburg branch of the Swedish Society for Woman Suffrage from 1902 to 1921.

Biography 
Frigga Carlberg was born in the parish of Falkenberg in Halland County, Sweden. She was born into a wealthy family but had great difficulty to persuade her father to allow her to study. She moved to Gothenburg after her marriage to the post official Andreas Carlberg (1850–1921) in 1876.
Carlberg engaged in women's issues and social work from her arrival in Gothenburg, and became an important member of the Gothenburg's Women's Association, which was founded in 1884 as the first women's association in Gothenburg. 
She founded , an organisation who provided homes for healthy children to parents infected with tuberculosis, chaired an organisation for female social workers and became a member of the Swedish Poor care association.

Suffrage work 
Carlberg became the central figure within social and politically interested women's circles in Gothenburg, and when the Swedish Society for Woman Suffrage was founded in 1902, she took the initiative for the establishment of the Gothenburg section and was elected as its chairman for its entire duration. She was well informed about in particular the British and American suffrage movement, and once invited English suffragette Sylvia Pankhurst (1882–1960) for a lecture. She also represented Sweden at several international conferences of women suffrage: first as a member of the Swedish Society for Woman Suffrage, and the last time, in Rome in 1923, as the representative of the Swedish government.

Writer 
As an author of novels and plays, she described both women's issues and the living conditions of the poor, which influenced policy. Her novel  (1918), alongside the novel  (1910) by Elin Wägner (1882–1949), is considered one of the more notable novel of the Swedish suffrage movement.

Awards 
Carlberg was awarded the Illis quorum in 1921.

References

Other sources 
Svenska män och kvinnor: biografisk uppslagsbok (Stockholm: Albert Bonniers Förlag. 1944)

Related reading
Christina Florin (2006) Kvinnor får röst (Stockholm : Atlas) 
Elin Wägner  (1910) Pennskaftet   (Bokförlaget Atlantis)

Further reading

External links
 

1851 births
1925 deaths
People from Halland
Swedish suffragists
Swedish feminists
Swedish women novelists
19th-century Swedish dramatists and playwrights
Swedish women dramatists and playwrights
20th-century Swedish dramatists and playwrights
19th-century Swedish novelists
20th-century Swedish novelists
Recipients of the Illis quorum